Seizure 6-like protein is a protein that in humans is encoded by the SEZ6L gene.

References

Further reading